Leon Hayward  (born 23 April 1990) is an Australian-born New Zealand field hockey player, who plays as a goalkeeper.

Personal life
Leon Hayward was born and raised in Darwin, Northern Territory.

He is the older brother of Kookaburras defender, Jeremy Hayward. His mother, Ellie, is of New Zealand descent.

Career

Domestic leagues

Australian Hockey League
Leon Hayward made his debut in the Australian Hockey League for the NT Stingers during the 2012 tournament in Canberra. He was named Goalkeeper of the Tournament during 2014 edition in Adelaide.

New Zealand National Hockey League
In 2019, Hayward represented the Auckland men's team in the New Zealand National Hockey League in Tauranga.

National teams

Australia Under-21
In 2009, Hayward represented the 'Burras' on two occasions; at the Australian Youth Olympic Festival and Junior World Cup, winning gold and bronze medals respectively.

Kookaburras
Leon Hayward made his debut for the Kookaburras in 2014, during a test series against India in Perth, Australia. His first and only major tournament for Australia was the 2015 Sultan Azlan Shah Cup in Ipoh, Malaysia, where he won a silver medal.

Black Sticks
Due to his mother's ancestry, Hayward was eligible for selection in the NZL Black Sticks. He made the move to play for New Zealand following a four-year absence from Australian senior selection.

He made his debut for the Black Sticks in 2019, during a test series against Japan in Stratford, New Zealand.

He was part of the New Zealand hockey squad which competed in the men's field hockey tournament during the 2020 Summer Olympics. It also marked his maiden appearance at the Olympics. He was also a member of the New Zealand hockey squad which competed in the men's field hockey tournament during the 2022 Commonwealth Games. It also eventually marked his maiden appearance at the Commonwealth Games.

He was also named in the New Zealand squad for the 2023 Men's FIH Hockey World Cup and it also marked his maiden FIH Hockey World Cup appearance. During the 2023 Hockey World Cup, he played a clinical and important role which helped New Zealand to qualify to the quarter-final of the competition. He did not start in the playing XI in any of the matches at the 2023 FIH Hockey World Cup as he was benched in favour of first-choice goal-keeper Dom Dixon. He played a huge role in New Zealand's stunning victory over hosts India in the crossover match during the 2023 World Cup which ended up in a penalty shootout where he made five saves out of eight penalties which effectively eliminated India out of the tournament. He came off the bench as a replacement to Dixon during the course of the decisive penalty shootout after both teams drew level at 3-3 before the final whistle was blown.

Accounting 
He also holds a full time job as a chartered accountant at Finnz Chartered Accountants in Waikato, Auckland. Prior to his commitment as a full-time employee at Finnz Chartered Accountants, he plied his trade in plenty of jobs in the field of finance and also had many coaching stints in field hockey. He reportedly admits that being a chartered accountant in day time and playing field hockey for 10 to 15 hours per week is a demanding job.

References

External links
 
 

1990 births
Living people
Australian male field hockey players
New Zealand male field hockey players
Male field hockey goalkeepers
Olympic field hockey players of New Zealand
Field hockey players at the 2020 Summer Olympics
Field hockey players at the 2022 Commonwealth Games
Sportspeople from Darwin, Northern Territory
Sportsmen from the Northern Territory
2023 Men's FIH Hockey World Cup players